Stetter is a German surname. Notable people with the surname include:

Florian Stetter (born 1977), German actor
Georg Stetter (1895–1988), Austrian-German nuclear physicist
George Stetter (born 1945), American player of Canadian football
Hans Stetter (born 1927), German actor
Karl Stetter (born 1941), German scientist
Mitch Stetter (born 1981), American baseball player
Wilhelm Stetter (1487−1552), Alsatian painter

See also
Dora Koch-Stetter (1881–1968), German artist
Stetter reaction, a reaction in organic chemistry

German-language surnames